James R. Tallon Jr. (born 1941) is an American politician and health-care expert.

Education
He received a B.A., cum laude, in political science from Syracuse University and an M.A. in international relations from Boston University. He has done additional graduate work at the Maxwell School of Citizenship and Public Affairs at Syracuse University. In 1995, he was awarded honorary doctorates of humane letters from the College of Medicine and School of Graduate Studies of the State University of New York Health Science Center at Brooklyn, and from New York Medical College.

Career
He entered politics as a Democrat. He was a member of the New York State Assembly from 1975 to 1993, sitting in the 181st, 182nd, 183rd, 184th, 185th, 186th, 187th, 188th, 189th and 190th New York State Legislatures. He was Majority Leader from 1987 to 1993, and was Acting Speaker for 3 days in 1991 after Mel Miller lost his seat upon a felony conviction until the election of Saul Weprin.  He was Chairman of the Assembly's Health Committee from 1979 to 1987, and spearheaded efforts to reform the Medicaid program while expanding eligibility for pregnant women and children.

In 1993, he joined the Henry J. Kaiser Family Foundation, and served as Chairman of the Kaiser Commission on the Future of Medicaid and is a member of the Joint Commission on the Accreditation of Healthcare Organizations. He also serves as Secretary for the Alpha Center and for the Association for Health Services Research, and is on the boards of the Alliance for Health Reform, The Commonwealth Fund, and the New York Academy of Medicine. He recently concluded a three-year term as a member of the Prospective Payment Assessment Commission (ProPAC), and has held visiting lecturer appointments at the Columbia University and Harvard University Schools of Public Health.

He is Chairman of the Kaiser Commission on Medicaid and the Uninsured. Mr. Tallon is President of the United Hospital Fund of New York, the nation's oldest federated charity. The Fund addresses critical issues affecting hospitals and health care in New York City through health services research and policy analysis, education and information activities, and grantmaking and volunteerism.

In 2007, Tallon was elected Chairman of the Commonwealth Fund after serving as director for over a decade.

Sources
 Bio at the Kaiser Family Foundation
 Bio at United Hospital Fund
 Bio at The Commonwealth Fund

References

1941 births
Living people
Maxwell School of Citizenship and Public Affairs alumni
Boston University alumni
Speakers of the New York State Assembly
Democratic Party members of the New York State Assembly
Politicians from Binghamton, New York